Montpelier Recreation Field is a baseball venue located in Montpelier, Vermont, United States and is the home field of the Vermont Mountaineers of the New England Collegiate Baseball League.  The field has served as home of the Mountaineers since 2003.

History

The Montpelier Senators and the Twin City Trojans
The field was constructed in 1940 by the Works Progress Administration, with support from the depression-era Federal Government, featuring a 1,200 seat capacity grandstand (which is still in use today) and bleachers down the firstbase and thirdbase lines. In the first decade of its existence, starting from 1941, it was home to the Montpelier Senators and, later the Twin City Trojans.

Robin Roberts
During this time the Robin Roberts played at Rec Field for the Twin City Trojans. He remembers his time at the Rec Field fondly: "It was a great experience ... you can't imagine a guy that age having a better summer then we had in Vermont."  "We were really good then. I won 17 straight starts that year in Vermont." In 1976 he was inducted into the Baseball Hall of Fame.

Vermont Mountaineers
When the league folded in 1952 Rec Field endured a half-century without a professional tenant. This ended in 2003 when the New England Collegiate Baseball League voted to award a franchise to a local Montpelier baseball group. Since then the Rec Field has been the home of the Vermont Mountaineers, enjoying high attendances and success on the field, with the Mountaineers reaching the post-season in six of their seven seasons, including an active six-year streak.

Full list of tenants
 1941-1952 - Montpelier Senators of the Second Northern League.
 1941-1952 - Twin City Trojans of the Second Northern League.
 2003–present - Vermont Mountaineers of the NECBL.

Attendance
In their inaugural season the Mountaineers enjoyed the highest average attendance in the league and have consistently been near the top of the league in this category since.

Notable events
Robin Roberts Night, July 21, 2003. Robin took the mound at the Rec Field for the first time since 1947, throwing out the ceremonial first pitch in front of nearly 3,000 fans.
The 2004 NECBL All-Star Game drew 4,127 spectators to Montpelier Recreation Field, a then-NECBL record for highest All-Star Game attendance.
The 2012 NECBL All-Star Game was played at the venue on July 22, 2012.

Photo gallery

External links
 Vermont Mountaineers website
 NECBL website
 Montpelier Recreation Field photo gallery at digitalballparks.com

References

Sports venues in Vermont
Minor league baseball venues
New England Collegiate Baseball League ballparks
Works Progress Administration in Vermont
Buildings and structures in Montpelier, Vermont
Baseball venues in Vermont
1940 establishments in Vermont
Sports venues completed in 1940